John Bradmore (d.1412) was an English surgeon and metalworker who was author of the Philomena, one of the earliest treatises on surgery. He was a court surgeon during the reign of King Henry IV of England. He is best known for extracting an arrow embedded in the skull of the king's son, the future king Henry V at Kenilworth, after the Battle of Shrewsbury in 1403.

Family
Bradmore is known to have practiced surgery along with other members of his family. His brother Nicholas Bradmore is also recorded as a surgeon in London, though John appears to have been the more successful of the two, amassing considerable property. John's daughter Agnes married another surgeon, John Longe. Bradmore worked as a court physician throughout the reign of King Henry IV.

According to historian Faye Getz, "Surgeons especially seem to have engaged in metalworking as a trade, probably making surgical instruments for themselves and for sale purposes." Bradmore was probably a skilled metalworker, as he is also referred to as a "gemestre" (gemster), which may mean he made jewellery.

Extraction
Before the Battle of Shrewsbury, Bradmore had been imprisoned on suspicion of using his metalworking skills for illegal purposes — namely counterfeiting coins. After the sixteen-year-old prince Henry had been shot in the face at Shrewsbury, he was released in order to aid him.

Bradmore attended the prince at Kenilworth, where the wounded Henry had been taken after the battle. An arrow penetrated on the left side below the eye and beside the nose of the young prince. When surgeons tried to remove the arrow, the shaft broke, leaving the bodkin point embedded in his skull some five to six inches deep, narrowly missing the brain stem and surrounding arteries. Several other physicians had already been called on to resolve the problem, but were unable to help. Bradmore's successor as royal surgeon, Thomas Morstede, later called them "lewd chattering leeches". 

Bradmore instructed honey to be poured into the wound and invented an instrument to be used in the extraction. Two threaded tongs held a centre threaded shaft, which could be inserted into the wound: the shape was not unlike a tapered threaded rod inside a split cylinder.  Once the end of the tongs located within the skirt of the arrowhead, the threaded rod was turned to open the tongs within the bodkin socket locking it into place and it, along with the device, could be extracted. The instrument was quickly made, either by Bradmore or by a blacksmith to Bradmore's specifications. Bradmore himself guided it into the wound to extract the arrowhead successfully. The wound was then filled with alcohol (wine) to cleanse it.

Later activities
For his service, he was paid an annuity of 10 sovereigns a year (approximately £26,720 in 2020).  There are also records of payments to him for medicines for the king. In 1408, Bradmore was appointed Searcher of the Port of London.

The Philomena, which documents the newly invented device and the surgery on the king, was written at some time between 1403 and Bradmore's death in 1412. It was published by Bradmore's son-in-law, John Longe. The original was written in Latin. It was translated into English in 1446.  

As an attendant to King Henry IV, Bradmore also oversaw the care of William Wyncelowe, the king's pavilioner, who had attempted suicide by stabbing himself in the abdomen. Wyncelowe had ruptured his intestines in the attempt. Bradmore attended him for 86 days, and Wyncelowe survived.

References

1412 deaths
English surgeons
English counterfeiters
15th-century English medical doctors
English inventors
14th-century English medical doctors